George Sim may refer to:

 George Charles Sim (1847–1922), journalist and member of the Queensland Legislative Assembly
 George Hamilton Sim (1852–1929), British Army officer and footballer who played for the Royal Engineers A.F.C.
 George Gall Sim (1878–1930), British administrator in India